Camp Upton was a port of embarkation of the United States Army during World War I. During World War II it was used to intern enemy aliens. It was located in Yaphank, New York in Suffolk County on Long Island, on the present-day location of Brookhaven National Laboratory.

History

World War I

Camp Upton, with a capacity of 18,000 troops was one of three transient embarkation camps directly under control of the New York Port of Embarkation during World War I. The camp was named after Emory Upton, a Union general of the Civil War. The camp was created in 1917 to house troops as they awaited ships for deployment overseas. From Camp Mills the units traveled by trains of the Long Island Rail Road to board ferryboats for the overseas piers in Brooklyn or Hoboken when scheduled for embarkation aboard troop ships.

The 152nd Depot Brigade was the garrison unit that received new recruits and prepared them for service overseas, and then out processed demobilizing soldiers at the end of the war. Irving Berlin, the composer, and Alvin York, the most decorated soldier of the American army in World War I, were processed at Camp Upton. The 77th Division was first organized there. During part of the war, the 82nd Division was quartered there.

At the end of World War I, the camp was used to demobilize and inactivate units. Some of the units demobilized at the camp were: the 327th Infantry Regiment, the 325th Infantry Regiment, the 27th Infantry Division's 53rd Brigade (105th, 106th Infantry Regiments and the 105th Machine Gun Battalion), and the 101st Signal Battalion.

In May 1919, Camp Upton became the site of the Recruit Educational Center, an Army program that enrolled foreign-born, non-English speaking, and illiterate soldiers. Most of the Recruit Educational Center's inductees were immigrants from Eastern and Southern Europe. In practice, the program aimed to "Americanize" these immigrants through instruction in the English language, military protocol, U.S. history, geography, citizenship, and political economy. Soldiers who graduated from the Recruit Educational Center at Camp Upton were eligible for a three-year term of military service, after which they could be naturalized as American citizens.

In 1921, the federal government sold the buildings and equipment, but kept the land, designating it Upton National Forest. Many of the structures from the camp were transported to form the first large scale settlement at Cherry Grove, New York on Fire Island.

World War II
Camp Upton was used as an Army induction center in the mobilization of 1940 that preceded the American entry into World War II. Later it was an internment site holding German, Italian and Japanese citizens who were in New York City or on merchant vessels at the time war broke out. On March 16, 1943, the internees were transferred to Fort George G. Meade in Maryland.  In September 1944, Camp Upton became a convalescent and rehabilitation hospital.

Brookhaven National Laboratory
In 1946, after the camp was closed, the federal government chose the site to build a nuclear research facility that would retain America's preeminence in that field. The former Camp Upton was renamed Brookhaven National Laboratory and was operated by AUI, a consortium of universities, for the United States Atomic Energy Commission.

In popular culture
Irving Berlin, while stationed at Camp Upton, wrote a musical, Yip, Yip, Yaphank, which included the memorable song "Oh! How I Hate to Get Up in the Morning." The musical was turned into a 1943 movie This Is The Army which starred Ronald Reagan.

See also
Upton, New York

References

External links
 Longwood Central School District's History of Camp Upton
 The Camp Upton Story (longislandgenealogy.com)
 Long Island to Over There (Long Island Newsday)
 Photographs of Camp Upton (firstworldwar.com)

Installations of the United States Army in New York (state)
Brookhaven, New York
Military installations established in 1917
Military installations closed in 1946
1917 establishments in New York (state)
1946 disestablishments in New York (state)